Serena Williams was the defending champion, but withdrew before the tournament began. 
Mona Barthel won the title, defeating Chanelle Scheepers in the final, 6–3, 7–6(7–3).

Seeds

Draw

Finals

Top half

Bottom half

Qualifying

Seeds

Qualifiers

Draw

First qualifier

Second qualifier

Third qualifier

Fourth qualifier

Fifth qualifier

Sixth qualifier

External Links
 Main draw
 Qualifying draw

Swedish Open - Singles
2014 Women's Singles